Hadi Shakouri (born May 2, 1982 in Tehran) is an Iranian football defender who last played for Sorkhpooshan Pakdasht in the Azadegan League. He works as head coach of Chooka Talesh F.C.

Club career
Shakouri, a product of the Pas Tehran youth academy played for the PAS Tehran first team since 2004. He won the Iran's Premier Football League With PAS Tehran F.C. in the season 2003/04 and played for PAS in AFC Champions League. On April 22, 2007, Shakouri signed for Qatari club Al-Arabi in a one-year deal.

Shakouri became a free agent after terminating his contract with Al-Arabi due to his child's illness and he was linked with a move to Persepolis. But on February 20, 2008, signed a contract until the end of the 2007–08 season with Zob Ahan
Despite having offer from Persepolis again He joined Esteghlal for 2008–09 season. He was one of the regular players of Esteghlal where they won the league. He left Esteghlal in June 2011 and joined Shahin Bushehr.

Club career statistics

 Assist Goals

International career
He made his debut for Iran in August 2005 in a match against Libya. He was used as Hossein Kaebi substitute for several times. He was selected among Iran's reserve men for the 2006 FIFA World Cup.

Hadi Shakouri had two more caps for the national team in August 2006, and in October 2006 he was called up again to join Team Melli in an LG cup tournament held in Jordan.

Honours

Club
Iran's Premier Football League
Winner: 2
2003–04 with Pas Tehran
2008–09 with Esteghlal
Runner up: 2
2005–06 with Pas Tehran
2010–11 with Esteghlal
Hazfi Cup
Runner up:1
2011–12 with Shahin Bushehr

References

External links
 
Hadi Shakouri on Instagram

Iranian footballers
Iran international footballers
Association football defenders
Persian Gulf Pro League players
Esteghlal F.C. players
Pas players
Zob Ahan Esfahan F.C. players
Shahin Bushehr F.C. players
Naft Tehran F.C. players
Iranian expatriate footballers
People from Tehran
1982 births
Living people
Al-Arabi SC (Qatar) players
Expatriate footballers in Qatar